Sade Vehre Aya Kar is a Punjabi Sufi poem written by noted Punjabi poet, Baba Bulleh Shah. It garnered exceptional fame when  Abida Parveen rendered it in her voice. This song is featured in many of her albums including Baba Bulleh Shah of 2003.

References

Punjabi-language songs
Pakistani songs